Carlos Quipo Pilataxi (born May 17, 1990, Quijos) is an Ecuador amateur boxer who competed at the 2012 and 2016 Olympics at light flyweight.

At the 2011 World Amateur Boxing Championships he defeated Ferhat Pehlivan (TUR) but lost to Devendro Singh (IND).

At the 2011 Pan American Games he lost his first bout to Juan Medina Herrad.

At the Olympic qualifier he upset PanAm champion Joselito Velázquez (MEX) in the semifinals and qualified for the Olympics.  At the 2012 Olympics he beat José Kelvin de la Nieve but lost to Kaeo Pongprayoon.

Quipo qualified for the 2016 Olympics through his performance at the 2016 APB and WSB Olympic Qualifier.  At the 2016 Olympic Games he reached the quarterfinals, beating Gankhuyagiin Gan-Erdene before losing to Nico Hernandez.

References

1990 births
Living people
Light-flyweight boxers
Boxers at the 2012 Summer Olympics
Boxers at the 2016 Summer Olympics
Boxers at the 2011 Pan American Games
Olympic boxers of Ecuador
Pan American Games competitors for Ecuador
Ecuadorian male boxers
People from Napo Province
21st-century Ecuadorian people